Robert Nethersole (by 1482? – 1556), of Dover, Kent, was an English politician.

Nethersole was a Member of Parliament (MP) for the constituency of Dover in 1523, 1529 and 1536.

References

15th-century births
1556 deaths
Members of the Parliament of England for Dover
English MPs 1523
English MPs 1529–1536
English MPs 1536